Bachi-Yurt (Bjaçi-Yurt) is a rural locality (a selo) in Kurchaloyevsky District, Chechnya.

Administrative and municipal status 
Municipally, Bachi-Yurt is incorporated as Bachi-Yurtovskoye rural settlement. It is the administrative center of the municipality and the only settlement included in it.

Geography 

Bachi-Yurt is located on both banks of the Gansol River.

The nearest settlements to Bachi-Yurt are Melchki in the north, Oyskhara and Verkhny Noyber in the north-east, Akhmat-Yurt in the east, Dzhigurty in the south, Mayrtup in the south-west, and Ilaskhan-Yurt in the north-west.

History 
In 1944, after the genocide and deportation of the Chechen and Ingush people and the Chechen-Ingush ASSR was abolished, the village of Bachi-Yurt was renamed to Pervomayskoye, and settled by people from the neighbouring republic of Dagestan.

In 1957, when the Vaynakh people returned and the Chechen-Ingush ASSR was restored, the village regained its old Chechen name, Bachi-Yurt.

Population 
 1979 Census: 6,296
 1990 Census: 7,342
 2002 Census: 14,756
 2010 Census: 16,485
 2019 estimate: 19,350

According to the results of the 2010 Census, the majority of residents of Bachi-Yurt (16,431) were ethnic Chechens, with 54 people from other ethnic backgrounds.

Infrastructure 
Bachi-Yurt hosts a sports center, named after Akhmad Kadyrov, and a local mosque.

References 

Rural localities in Kurchaloyevsky District